El Bluff Airport  was an airport on El Bluff, once an island in the entrance to Bluefields Bay, South Caribbean Coast Autonomous Region, Nicaragua, but now connected to the mainland via a causeway constructed between 2004 and 2007. Google Earth Historical Imagery show progressive deterioration of the asphalt runway until a helicopter pad and hangar were built on the southwestern end in 2013. The hangar was torn down and the helipad markings removed sometime after 2015.

See also

 List of airports in Nicaragua
 Transport in Nicaragua

References

External links
 OpenStreetMap - El Bluff
 OurAirports - El Bluff
 FallingRain - El Bluff

Defunct airports
Airports in Nicaragua